Petz: Catz 2 and Petz: Dogz 2 are video games for the PC, Nintendo DS, PlayStation 2 and Wii, the latter two are similar to The Dog Island. Players can choose from 40 breeds of dogs or cats; in Dogz most breeds have a choice of two fur colours. In Europe these games are titled Dogz and Catz.

Wii and PS2 versions 
Unlike the PC and DS versions, the Wii and PlayStation 2 versions of the games are adventure games, so instead of taking care of a virtual pet, the player plays as a dog or cat who lives in a southern half of a village called Pawville, on a large island. The player goes on an adventure to stop an evil wolf named Ivlet from causing chaos on the island, and eventually destroying the world.

There are various other characters, such as Victor, a friend of the player character, Gertrude, who runs the medicine shop known as the "Drug Store", Kenneth, who runs a Zoo, Stanley, a carpenter, and many others.

The Wii versions of Petz Dogz 2 and Petz Catz 2 (Catz and Dogz in Europe) were originally released in Japan under the name Kitten And The Magic Hat (Catz 2) & Puppy And The Magic Hat. (Dogz 2)

Jacob Kaufman composed the soundtrack for these games.

Gameplay
The game is based on The Dog Island, in which the player controls a dog or cat through environments while completing tasks. Before the game starts, the player is asked to choose the animal's breed, gender, and finally, name, all of which have no bearing in the game itself. The player can walk, run, creep, and push rocks as locomotion. Throughout the game, the player faces a variety of hostile animals, such as snakes, gorillas, bats, and others, who will hurt the player if they tread too closely. When an enemy attacks, the bubble indicating their mood above their head changes. The player starts out at 3 HP, which is upgraded at certain points in the game up to 8; if all of them are depleted, the player has to start over from the last save point. The player can stun enemies by barking/meowing behind them, which can be held down for a longer effect (in the dog's case, it will turn their bark into a howl), or by throwing pebbles against them. Bubbles appear above friendly non-playable characters as well to indicate that they need the player's help for a task.

The player can explore 14 locales in the game, including the beach "Dolphin Coast", lake "Lappy Lake", forest "Whisker Woods", and so on. Not all of them are open for the player at the start, requiring specific tasks to be completed first. While the player will visit every area at one point in the game, many parts are optional and can be opened by skills obtained later in the game. Once the player earns the Warp Ring from Arvin (the player character's father) they can warp between six locales for free through a magical stone normally used for saving. Each area has its own hazards independent from the hostile animals, such as a poisonous lake in Sky Heights, overheating in Inferno Cave, and tornadoes in Lonesome Park. Some areas host zoo animals that can be challenged for mini-games, including soccer and sprint, to make them return to South Pawville's zoo, where the player can challenge them again. The game is tightly knit as compared to The Dog Island; South Pawville acts as a central hub that connects all branches of the island. Due to this, there is no traveler's inn or shop; every purchase and full healing through sleeping are therefore only conductible in South Pawville.

The game has a variety of obtainable items. Fruits, vegetables, and plot-related items are collected by sniffing and digging them (availability and location of the items are indicated in two circles that appear when the player are sniffing). The player can catch butterflies, insects, and fishes, each of which can be sold at the pawn shop in South Pawville for gold, or, in the case of fishes, sent to the aquarium for later viewing. Gold, the game's currency, is also received as reward for completing tasks and can be spent to buy healing items, accessories, and clothing.

The dog and cat editions of the game have virtually identical content, aside from the different animals populating them and certain theme naming (e.g. healing items in the game are named after meat for dogs, but tunas for cats).

Plot
The player is a dog or cat living in South Pawville, a town located on a large island. The player's father, Arvin, owns the Magic Hat, a family inheritance that contains a powerful magic, which can be used for good or evil. When the player's best friend Victor talks about an evil wolf named Ivlet jailed at North Pawville's police station, he invites the player to investigate. Sheriff Ada warns them against nearing Ivlet, who usually sleeps during the day. This gives Victor idea of visiting him at night.

When the two visit Ivlet that night, he tricks the player into giving him the Magic Hat. This empowers him with magic, which he uses to destroy both Pawvilles and make wild animals hostile. Ada jails the player, but is freed by Augusta, who says that the player should take responsibility by helping the townsfolk, while Victor decides to take the player's place as a compromise. Outside the police station, the player meets with Beat, the personification of the Magic Hat's good side, who asks for the player's help in retrieving back the hat.

After the player helps out all of the Pawvilles' townsfolk, they are instructed by Arvin to meet with and assist Theophilus, a wizard living in Sky Heights, in combating Ivlet. Theophilus says that the Magic Hat, normally colored blue, grows darker if always used for evil, and if it turns black, it will corrupt its user into a monster. Suppressing the hat's power requires the Magic Shield, made from three crystals: the Water, Earth, and Ice Crystals. Once the player collects them, Theophilus sends the player to rendezvous with his brother, Bartholomew, who travelled to Gongoro Peak but didn't return. The two wizards proceed to Sky Heights and plan the attack on Ivlet, who lives in an astral dimension, and invite the player to assist them. The three manage to defeat Ivlet and the dragon he summons.

Retrieving back the Magic Hat, Beat says that since his task is done, he will have to part ways with the player, before entering the Magic Hat and returning it back to its normal color. The player returns home and is welcomed by their parents, with Arvin deciding to pass the Magic Hat to the player.

PC version
In this version, the player cares for a cat or dog, similar to the rest of the Petz series.

DS versions
Petz: Dogz 2 and Petz: Catz 2 on DS is a virtual pet game in some ways. However unlike the other platform versions, these versions are quite different. They are released in the US under those titles, whereas they're called Dogz 2 and Catz 2 in the UK.

In the dog version, the player can choose one of 11 breeds per game, but cannot give the pet an actual name. They can also change their pet. The pets do not need feeding, grooming or resting (although these can be done, they are not compulsory) and the main goal of the game is to furnish the player's house. The house gets larger as the player gets more items, which are acquired by playing a variety of minigames.
Along with the minigames, there is also a painting game which appears on the Main Menu after obtaining enough items. In this game the player is able to colour portraits of the breeds of the pet. Petz Dogz 2/Dogz 2 was originally released in Japan under the name Ocha-Ken no Heya DS. Ocha-Ken no Heya DS was a tie in to a Japanese media franchise called Ocha-Ken.

In the cat version, the player is able to adopt and name their cat, and it is required to feed, groom, and love your pet. The player can also dress up their cat, and allow it to play in various themed rooms, such as the "Safari Room"  and the "Castle Room". The player is also able to have three different loads, each with a different cat, and the main goal is to take care of the cat and gain its trust.

GBA version

Similar to the PC and DS versions, the GBA port is a simulator game in which the player takes care of a cat or dog.

External links
 Petz: Dogz 2 and Catz 2 walkthrough on StrategyWiki
 Catz 2 official DS minisite (Japanese)
 Dogz 2 official DS minisite (Japanese)
 Dogz 2 And Catz 2 official Wii site (Japanese)

2007 video games
Nintendo DS games
PlayStation 2 games
Ubisoft games
Video games scored by Jake Kaufman
Video games developed in France
Virtual pet video games
Wii games
Windows games
Game Boy Advance games
Adventure games
Multiplayer and single-player video games
MacOS games
Video games about cats
Video games about dogs
ImaginEngine games